Sanctuary is a 1961 drama film directed by Tony Richardson. The film, based on the William Faulkner novels Sanctuary (1931) and Requiem for a Nun (1951), is about the black maid of a white woman who kills the latter's newborn in order to give her employer a way out of a predicament, and then faces the death penalty.

Plot
In 1928, in the county of Yoknapatawpha, Mississippi, Nancy Mannigoe, a 30-year-old black woman, is condemned to death for the willful murder of the infant son of her white employer Mrs. Gowan Stevens, the former Temple Drake. On the eve of the scheduled execution, Temple tries to save Nancy by telling her father, the governor, of the events leading up to the murder.

Six years earlier, Temple was a pleasure-loving college girl carrying on a flirtatious romance with young Gowan Stevens. One night, Gowan got drunk and took her to a backwoods still where she was raped by Candy Man, a Cajun bootlegger. The next morning, although in a state of semi-shock, she willingly submitted to more of his lovemaking, and then agreed to live with him in a New Orleans brothel. Nancy became her personal maid, and Temple reveled in her new life, until Candy Man was reported killed in an auto accident and Temple was forced to go home. Marriage to Gowan followed; but for Temple it was a dull life, and she hired Nancy as a servant to remind her of the brothel life she had loved so much. Suddenly, Candy Man returned, and Temple decided to abandon her home and marriage and once more run off with him. To bring Temple to her senses and prevent her from ruining her life, Nancy sacrificed the infant child by smothering it to death.

Though shocked by the candor of his daughter's confession, the governor is unable to grant a pardon for Nancy. The next morning Temple visits Nancy in her cell. As the two women beg each other's forgiveness, Temple realizes that it is only through Nancy's sacrifice that she has been able to find salvation.

E. Pauline Degenfelder of Worcester Public Schools estimated that thirty percent of the plot takes place in the present time with the remainder in flashback; of that seventy percent flashback material, she attributed forty percent to the original novel, eight percent to the sequel novel, and the remainder to "a transition between Sanctuary and Requiem". The Lee Goodwin/Tommy element is not included. A car accident was used as a plot device for Temple to be discovered as, due to the absence of the aforementioned element, Horace Benbow is not in this version and therefore cannot track her down.

Production
Richard D. Zanuck produced the film. He made it an adaptation of both Faulkner novels because there were more commercial opportunities and because he believed the sequel novel alone could not be properly adapted into a film. Zanuck acquired the filming rights to both novels, and as part of this he spent $75,000 on the rights to The Story of Temple Drake as he was required to do so to get the said rights to the original novel.

James Poe wrote the script, using an outline and prologue made by Zanuck because the latter was unable to contact Faulkner through employees sent to visit the author.

Richardson stated that he wished to work on the film partly due to the depiction of the 1920s and 1930s United States in the original script, but he disliked the editing process for American films at the time and therefore he disliked the completed film.

Cast

 Lee Remick as Temple Drake
 Even though Temple is formally known as "Mrs. Gowan Stevens", she still calls herself by her maiden name. Gene D. Phillips of Loyola University of Chicago stated that internally she still perceives herself to be "an irresponsible adolescent" and undeserving of a reputation of being a responsible wife. Degenfelder argued that this film does not have a consistent Temple as it tried but failed to reconcile the two different Temples from the novels, and that the resulting character was "weak". In addition, while that film was, according to the reviewer, trying to have a dual nature like with the first film, she felt that Temple is "unconvincing" in the "vamp" role.
 Odetta as Nancy Mannigoe
 Phillips described the character as "the focal point of the entire action of the combined stories." In the portions adapted from the first novel, Nancy takes the role originally used by the character Ruby Lamar. This film works in a foreshadowing where Nancy says that Candy Man's still building is not suitable for a child to live in, which plays into the later scene where Nancy kills Temple's child to prevent the baby from being corrupted.
 Yves Montand as Candy Man
 He is an amalgamation of characters from both source novels: Popeye, Red, and Pete (Red's brother). Phillips wrote that Candy's "French accent gives him an exotic quality" attracting Temple to him; the film has the character originate in New Orleans to match the change. Phillips stated that the merging of Pete into Candy Man means the film is made "more tightly into a continuous narrative" from the plots of the two original works, and also that the film does not have to make efforts to establish a new character towards the film's end. According to Degenfelder, the new character name is a reference to his sexual allure and his job illegally transporting alcohol, as "candy" also referred to alcohol. Bosley Crowther of The New York Times stated that Candy Man sounds like Charles Boyer.
 Bradford Dillman as Gowan Stevens
 Harry Townes as Ira Bobbitt
 The novel version is Gavin Stevens. Gene Phillips of Loyola University of Chicago wrote that the name was likely altered to avoid confusion with Gowan.
 Howard St. John as Governor Drake
 He is an amalgamation of the governor and Judge Drake (Temple's father) from the original works. Phillips wrote that making the governor her father is "possibly to explain quickly and plausibly her easy access to a man in this position".
 Jean Carson as Norma
 Reta Shaw as Miss Reba
 Strother Martin as Dog Boy
 William Mims as Lee
 Marge Redmond as Flossie
 Jean Bartel as Swede

Horace Benbow, Lee Goodwin, and Tommy do not appear in this version.

Degenfelder wrote that the merging of characters results in "ludicrous coincidence" being a feature of the plot.

Reception

Phillips characterized the reaction from the general audiences and from film critics as "lukewarm".

Crowther wrote that the film "no more reflects or comprehends the evil in the Faulkner stories or the social corruption suggested in them than did" the previous adaptation, and that Sanctuary was a "melodrama of the most mechanical and meretricious sort" that lacked the explanation for Temple's behavior. Crowther praised Remick's acting.

Degenfelder argued that the source material was poorly combined and adapted, with the work "woefully deficient in movement", resulting in "an artistic disaster." In addition she felt this version was misogynistic.

Phillips argued that the film does have "much of the flavor of Faulkner" and that it would be difficult to depict the original novel's events in a film that would be acceptable for general audiences.

See also
 List of American films of 1961

References

Notes

External links
 
 

1961 films
1961 drama films
20th Century Fox films
CinemaScope films
American black-and-white films
American drama films
Films about rape
Films about prostitution
Films based on American novels
Films based on multiple works
Films based on works by William Faulkner
Films directed by Tony Richardson
Films produced by Darryl F. Zanuck
Films scored by Alex North
Films set in Mississippi
Films set in the 1920s
Films with screenplays by James Poe
Southern Gothic films
1960s English-language films
1960s American films